Lais of Corinth (fl. 425 BC) was a famous hetaira or courtesan of ancient Greece, who was probably born in Corinth. She shared a name with the younger hetaira Lais of Hyccara; as ancient authors (in their usually indirect accounts) often confused them or did not indicate which one they referred to, the two women became inextricably linked. Lais lived during the Peloponnesian War and was said to be the most beautiful woman of her time. Among her clients were the philosopher Aristippus (two of his alleged writings were about Lais) and the Olympic champion Eubotas of Cyrene.

Aelian relates a tradition that either she or the other Lais held the nickname "Axine" ("axehead"), for the sharpness of her cruelty.

Anne Robertson referenced Corinth for its one thousand temple prostitutes most notably Lais. The city's reputation “added a new word to the Greek language. Korinthiazesthai (to live like a Corinthian) meant to live a life of wealthy, drunken debauchery.”

See also
Lais of Corinth (Hans Holbein the Younger)

References

Hetairai
Ancient Corinthians
Greek female prostitutes
5th-century BC Greek people
5th-century BC Greek women